Pycnophyllopsis is a genus of flowering plants belonging to the family Caryophyllaceae.

Its native range is Peru to Argentina.

Species:

Pycnophyllopsis cryptantha 
Pycnophyllopsis keraiopetala 
Pycnophyllopsis laevis 
Pycnophyllopsis macrophylla 
Pycnophyllopsis muscosa 
Pycnophyllopsis smithii 
Pycnophyllopsis tetrasticha 
Pycnophyllopsis weberbaueri

References

Caryophyllaceae
Caryophyllaceae genera